Blaesodactylus antongilensis is a species of gecko endemic to Madagascar.

References

Blaesodactylus
Reptiles described in 1980